Anthony F. Tallarico (September 20, 1933 – January 6, 2022) was an American comic book artist, and children's book illustrator and author. Often paired in a team with his generally uncredited penciler, Bill Fraccio, Tallarico drew primarily for Charlton Comics and Dell Comics, including, for the latter, the comic book Lobo, the first to star an African-American.

Biography

Early life and career
Tony Tallarico was born in Brooklyn, New York on September 20, 1933, and attended New York City's School of Industrial Art, the Brooklyn Museum Art School, and the School of Visual Arts. He got his start in comics in 1953, penciling and self-inking stories for such publishers as Charlton Comics, Trojan, and the David C. Cook Publishing Company, for which he contributed to a newspaper Sunday-supplement comic book similar to "The Spirit Section".

The Silver Age
In 1961, Tallarico illustrated the Gilberton Company's  Classics Illustrated #160, its adaptation of H. G. Wells' The Food of the Gods; Classics Illustrated Junior #571, "How Fire Came to the Indians"; and Classics Illustrated Junior #574, the European folk tale "Brightboots". He also drew individual chapters in several issues in Gilberton's World Around Us series. At the end of the decade, Tallarico supplied second painted covers for reprints of Classics Illustrated #81, Homer's The Odyssey, and #96, historian John Bakeless' Daniel Boone: Master of the Wilderness.

He drew the sole two issues of  Lobo (Dec. 1965 & Sept. 1966) — also listed as Dell Comics #12-438-512 and #12-439-610 in publisher Dell Comics' quirky numbering system — the first known comic book to star an African-American. This Western series, scripted by Don Arneson, chronicled the adventures of a wealthy, unnamed African-American gunslinger hero, called "Lobo" by the first issue's antagonists. Tallarico and Arneson dispute who originally conceived the character.

A single-issue, small-press comic book in 1947, All-Negro Comics was an omnibus featuring a black detective, a black adventurer and others in separate features. Likewise, while Marvel Comics' 1950s predecessor Atlas Comics had included the feature "Waku, Prince of the Bantu — starring an African chieftain in Africa, with no regularly featured Caucasian characters — as one of four features in the omnibus series Jungle Tales (Sept. 1954 - Sept. 1955). Aside from Lobo, there would be no black title star of a comic until Luke Cage, Hero for Hire (June 1972), though black supporting characters such as the Black Panther and the Falcon were introduced in the interim.

Tallarico drew the one-shot "Great Society Comic Book" (1966), which portrayed President Lyndon B. Johnson and other Democrats as superheroes, fighting against evil conservatives.  He was involved with the follow-up comic, "Bobman and Teddy", starring Robert and Ted Kennedy as a Batman-and-Robin-like dynamic duo.

Under the joint pseudonym Tony Williamson and, later, Tony Williamsune, Tallarico and his generally uncredited penciler, Bill Fraccio, collaborated on many stories for Warren Publishing's horror-comics magazines Creepy, Eerie and Vampirella.

Tallarico's work includes issues of the Charlton superhero comic Blue Beetle and its TV tie-in and teen idol comics Bewitched and Bobby Sherman. He also drew Dell's 1966-1967 Frankenstein and Dracula superhero series and Harvey Comics' short-lived superhero title Jigsaw. His last recorded work in the comic book field is the story "Double Occupancy" in Charlton's Ghost Manor #15 (Oct. 1973).

Later career
In the 1970s, Tallarico began writing/illustrating children's books for such publishers as Fitzgerald Publishing, Kidsbooks,  Tuffy Books, Modern, Simon & Schuster, Price Stern Sloan, Treasure Books, Concordia Publishing House, Putnam, and Little Simon. Still active as of the mid-2000s, Tallarico by his counts has created more than 1,000 children's books, including the Where Are They? series.

Personal life and death
Tallarico was married to a writer, Elvira, for over 44 years. They had two children, Nina Reyes and Tony John Tallarico. He died on January 6, 2022, at the age of 88.

Awards
On May 19, 2006, Tallarico was bestowed the East Coast Black Age of Comics Convention's Pioneer Award for Lifetime Achievement, in recognition of his creating the first comic book to star an African-American. He was an honoree at the reception dinner at the African American Museum in Philadelphia, Pennsylvania.

See also
List of African-American firsts

References

External links
  (newsletter); scroll down to "Tony Tallarico Award". Original page.

1933 births
2022 deaths
American comics artists
American people of Italian descent
Charlton Comics
High School of Art and Design alumni
School of Visual Arts alumni
Silver Age comics creators
Artists from Brooklyn